Australia: Boom to Bust is a 2014 book by the economist Lindsay David. David was a student of the world's most prestigious business school International Institute for Management Development in Lausanne, Switzerland

Synopsis
The book argues Australia is facing an unprecedented housing and credit bubble, by comparing exposure of Australian banks to extraordinary levels of debt and the relatively non-diverse Australian economy with the conditions leading to other financial crashes, such as the financial crisis of 2007–2008 and the Lost Two Decades in Japan.
David points out that housing prices in Sydney are higher than in London, Tokyo, Geneva or New York City, in some cases significantly.

Reception
His book was reviewed in the Australian Financial Review and Macro Business amongst others.

References

2014 non-fiction books
Books about politics of Australia
Books about Australia
Books about capitalism
CreateSpace books